John Vertin (July 17, 1844 – February 26, 1899) was a Slovenian-born American prelate of the Roman Catholic Church. He served as the third bishop of the Diocese of Sault Sainte Marie and Marquette in Michigan from 1879 until his death in 1899.

Life

Early life
John Vertin (sometimes spelled Wertin) was born on July 17, 1844, in Dobliče in the Duchy of Carniola in the Austrian Empire (present-day Črnomelj, Slovenia) and baptized Johann Vertin. He was the second of four children of Joseph and Mary (née Deržaj) Vertin. Vertin received his early education at the gymnasium in Novo Mesto.

Joseph Vertin was a merchant who came to the United States in 1852 .  He settled in Michigan and opened general stores in Hancock and Calumet (now known as Vertin Gallery). Joseph Vertin returned to Carniola in 1857. 

At age 18, John Vertin arrived in New York City with his parents and siblings on July 7, 1863 and departed for Michigan.Vertin entered Saint Francis de Sales Seminary in St. Francis, Wisconsin, in 1864 to study for the priesthood.

Priesthood
Vertin was ordained a priest for the Diocese of Sault Sainte Marie and Marquette on August 31, 1866 by Bishop Frederic Baraga. It was the first ordination performed in Marquette, Michigan.

Vertin's first assignment was as pastor of Saint Ignatius Loyola Parish in Houghton, Michigan, where he served from 1866 to 1871. He was then transferred to Saint Paul's Parish in Negaunee, Michigan, remaining there for eight years. Both were difficult assignments, with congregations who spoke many different languages and Saint Paul's, in particular, was burdened with significant debt.

Bishop of Sault Sainte Marie and Marquette
On May 16, 1879, Vertin was appointed the third bishop of the Diocese of Sault Sainte Marie and Marquette by Pope Leo XIII. He succeeded Bishop Ignatius Mrak and was the third Slovenian bishop of the diocese, which had been led by Bishop Baraga before Mrak. He received his episcopal consecration on September 14, 1879, from Bishop Michael Heiss, with Bishops Caspar Borgess and John Spalding serving as co-consecrators, at Saint Paul's in Negaunee. At age 34, Vertin became the youngest Catholic bishop in the country.

Just under a month after his consecration, St. Peter Cathedral in Marquette burned to the ground. This was allegedly an act of arson by some angry parishioners over the removal of the cathedral's pastor, Reverend John Kenny. Vertin rebuilt the cathedral, laying the cornerstone in June 1881 and consecrating the new building in July 1890. The main altar was a gift from Vertin's father and a side altar was donated by Vertin's brother-in-law.

From October to November 1884, Vertin attended the third Plenary Council of Baltimore. He sat on the Council's committee for Christian doctrine and brought Reverend Francis Weninger with him as his theologian. In 1889, Vertin convoked a conference with the diocese's priests, which created an infirm priests' fund and required all Catholic children to attend Catholic school. Over the course of his 20 years as bishop, Vertin oversaw an increase in the diocese's Catholic population from 20,000 to 60,000, the number of churches from 27 to 56, and the number of priests from 20 to 62.

Death and legacy 
John Vertin died in Marquette on February 26, 1899, at age 54. He is buried in the crypt of St. Peter Cathedral.

References

1844 births
1899 deaths
People from the Municipality of Črnomelj
Austrian Empire emigrants to the United States
19th-century Roman Catholic bishops in the United States
Roman Catholic bishops of Marquette
Burials at St. Peter Cathedral (Marquette, Michigan)